This is a list of nature parks of Turkey. As of October 2010, there are twelve nature reserves located at the coastal regions of the country. These protected areas are administered by the  Directorate-General of Nature Protection and National Parks of the Ministry of Environment and Forest.

See also
List of national parks of Turkey

References

External links
 General Directorate of Nature Conservation and National Parks of Turkey

Nature parks